Nicholas Han Jide (born 1940) is a Chinese Catholic priest and Bishop of the Diocese of Pingliang since 1999. He is a member of the Standing Committee of Catholic Patriotic Association.

Biography
Nicholas Han Jide was born in China in 1940. He was ordained a priest at the St. Joseph's Church in Qingyang on September 19, 1996, as a member of the Underground Church by Philippe Ji Ma, Bishop of Pingliang. On September 5, 1999, he became Bishop of Pingliang. He was replaced by Pope Benedict XVI.

References

1940 births
Living people
21st-century Roman Catholic bishops in China
Bishops of the Catholic Patriotic Association